Calamagrostis koelerioides, the fire reedgrass, is a species of grass in the family Poaceae native to western North America. It ranges from western Wyoming to Washington state, south to Mexico. It is found in many habitat types.

The inflorescence is a dense array of spikelets with the individual branches bunched parallel along the stem.

References

External links
Photo gallery at CalPhotos

koelerioides
Native grasses of California
Flora of Alaska
Flora of Oregon
Flora of Washington (state)
Flora of Wyoming
Flora of Idaho
Flora of Montana
Grasses of the United States
Flora without expected TNC conservation status